Skewbald/Grand Union, also known as 2 Songs, is the eponymous archival EP featuring the only studio recordings by American hardcore punk band Skewbald/Grand Union.

Background

Skewbald/Grand Union

Commonly known as simply Skewbald, Skewbald/Grand Union was a short-lived hardcore punk band from Washington, D.C., founded by Ian MacKaye and Jeff Nelson, after their previous band, Minor Threat, broke up for their first time in September 1981. Their lineup was rounded out by guitarist Edward Janney and bassist John Falls.

The band's strange name was a result of a friendly dispute between MacKaye and Nelson. The four-piece was initially named Grand Union, after a nearby grocery store. MacKaye then found the word "skewbald" in a dictionary, and thought it was a better name. Nelson, however, still preferred Grand Union. The two were unable to favor either title, and the disagreement was never settled.

In November 1981, the band recorded three untitled demo songs, not originally intended for release, in a self-produced session, engineered by Don Zientara at Inner Ear Studios in Arlington, Virginia. After recording, the rehearsals came to a halt and Falls left the project. Eventually, MacKaye moved from vocals to bass and the band practiced as a three-piece a few more times in early 1982, but Skewbald/Grand Union, who never came to play a show, was dissolved upon the reformation of Minor Threat in the spring of 1982.

Release
For ten years, the recordings of Skewbald/Grand Union made the rounds in tape trading circles and some erroneously believed that the songs were Minor Threat outtakes.

In 1991, the demo received a proper release, on 7-inch clear vinyl, when Dischord Records issued the one-sided EP Skewbald/Grand Union to commemorate the label's 50th release. Two out of the three songs were merged on the first track.

Reissues
Skewbald/Grand Union was reissued as a CD EP in October 1997. Individual tracks were made also available as digital downloads.

In 2002, the medley "Sorry/Change for the Same" was featured on the 3-CD compilation box set 20 Years of Dischord.

Track listing

Personnel
Band
Ian MacKaye – vocals
Edward Janney – guitar
John Falls – bass
Jeff Nelson – drums

Production
Skewbald – production
Don Zientara – engineering

Notes

References

External links
"Dischord Records: Skewbald, 2 Songs". dischord.com.
"Dischord Records: Skewbald". dischord.com.
Skewald/Grand Union (EP). allmusic.com.
 Skewald/Grand Union (EP). discogs.com.

1991 EPs
Dischord Records EPs
EPs published posthumously